Iberophone or Pan-Iberian space (Iberofonía or espacio iberófono o panibérico in Spanish, Iberofonia or espaço iberófono ou panibérico in Portuguese) is a neologism used to designate the Iberian languages-speaking countries, mainly Spanish and Portuguese.

Definition
It encompasses the Hispanophone (Spanish-speaking) and Lusophone (Portuguese-speaking) communities across the world, including 600 million people in Ibero-America (Iberian language-speaking America), 60 million people in Europe's Iberian Peninsula (Portugal, Spain, and Andorra), 60 million people in Lusophone Africa (Cape Verde, São Tomé and Príncipe, Guinea-Bissau, Angola and Mozambique), 1.3 million people in Hispanophone Africa (Equatorial Guinea), 600 thousand people in Lusophone Asia (Macau), (Goa) and (Malacca), 1.3 million people in Lusophone Oceania (East Timor) as well as a vast linguistic diaspora across the world.

The Organization of Ibero-American States (OEI) is a supranational association of Iberian languages-speaking countries in Africa, the Americas and in Europe, while the Community of Portuguese Language Countries (CPLP) encompasses all Portuguese-speaking nations across Africa, America, Asia, Oceania, and Europe. A pan-Iberian organization representing all Iberian language-speaking nations of every continent currently does not exist, though the increased interest into the Iberophone Space or Iberian World has spurred greater cooperation between the OEI and CPLP. The terms "Iberian world",  "Luso-Hispanic world", "multinational space of Iberian languages-speaking countries" and "African-Iberian-Latin American space" have also been used.

Area, population, and GDP

See also
 Francophone
 Hispanophone
 Ibero-America
 Lusophone

References

Geopolitics
Iberian Romance languages
Geographical distribution of Romance languages